Thomas Patrick Faiers (born 19 April 1987) is an English former professional  road racing cyclist. He rode one professional season with UCI ProTour team Saunier Duval–Prodir.

Palmares 

2009
8th U23 Vuelta Madrid
1st U23 Championship of Asturias
1st Elite U23 GP Orgario 
1st Elite U23 GP Cantabria.
1st GP San Miguel
1st Vuelta a Oriente

References 
 http://www.pezcyclingnews.com/?pg=fullstory&id=8345&status=True&catname=Latest%20News
 http://www.cyclingweekly.co.uk/news/latest/440583/tom-faiers-in-his-words.html 
http://www.velonation.com/News/ID/7674/Tom-Faiers-Interview-Going-from-Footon-to-Wonderful-Pistachios.aspx

1987 births
Living people
English male cyclists
Sportspeople from Cheltenham